Sonata Arctica is a Finnish power metal band from the town of Kemi, Finland. Created as a hard rock band named Tricky Beans, they later changed to Tricky Means and finally to Sonata Arctica, when they shifted to power metal. The current lineup consists of drummer Tommy Portimo, lead singer Tony Kakko, keyboardist Henrik Klingenberg, guitarist Elias Viljanen and bassist Pasi Kauppinen. All the musicians of the band's history except Portimo also acted as backing vocalists.

As of 2022, the band has released ten full-length albums (three via Spinefarm Records and seven via Nuclear Blast), their most recent being Talviyö on September 6, 2019.

Biography

Formation and early years (1996–1999)
The band was founded by drummer Tommy Portimo and guitarists Jani Liimatainen and Marko Paasikoski in Kemi. At the end of 1995, lead vocalist Tony Kakko was added and bassist Pentti Peura joined in early 1996. Originally named Tricky Beans, they played hard rock rather than the power metal with which they grew to fame. Kakko explained that when he was invited to join the band, Paasikoski said the band was going to play "a mixture of Megadeth and Spin Doctors". During their early career, they recorded three demos which were never sent to a recording label — Friend 'til the End, Agre Pamppers and PeaceMaker. According to Kakko, the band's first name was based on one of their early songs, which was "about a lady who was tricky and I didn't really know what I was talking about (laughs)". Their first show was about to take place but they were still unnamed, so they had to come up with something.

In 1997 the band changed their name to Tricky Means, and from that point until 1999 their style was thoroughly worked upon and ultimately was drastically changed, acquiring a strong emphasis on the keyboard melodies and relying on an easily distinguishable rhythm line maintained both by the bass and the guitar. Vocalist Tony Kakko developed a clean singing style which relies both on falsetto and tenor voices. Kakko has stated that the change of sound was influenced by fellow Finnish power metal band Stratovarius. At that time, Pentti Peura was fired and Marko Paasikoski left due to a lack of gigging. Two months later the band got signed to a three-album deal with Spinefarm, which left Marko displeased. The band finally changed their name to Sonata Arctica, because they thought they wouldn't be able to sell metal albums with the previous name and also because Spinefarm asked them to do so. "Sonata Arctica" was suggested by a friend of the band: "sonata" for the music and "arctica" for their home (Kemi, in Northern Finland).

In 1997, they recorded a demo entitled FullMoon in Kemi's Tico Tico Studios, which was their first real metal recording. The line-up consisted of Portimo, Liimatainen, Kakko and new bassist Janne Kivilahti (who started first as second guitarist). The demo was sent to Spinefarm Records by a friend of the band and a recording deal soon followed.

Ecliptica and Silence (1999–2002)

Later that year, Sonata Arctica's first single, entitled "UnOpened", was released in Finland. Soon after, the band had closed deals with labels from around the world, prior to the release of their debut album. The debut Ecliptica arrived by the end of 1999 and had a worldwide release. Tony Kakko then decided to focus on singing and the band began seeking a new keyboard player. Mikko Härkin (ex-Kenziner) was eventually invited to fill the position.

At the beginning of 2000, Sonata Arctica was chosen to support the well-known power metal band Stratovarius throughout their European tour. Marko Paasikoski returned to the band to play bass in the wake of Janne Kivilahti's departure after the tour. According to Kakko, Kivilahti left because he thought they weren't going anywhere and Paasikoski was their first choice as the new bassist since he left just before the band got their first record deal.

Throughout Winter 2000/2001, the band worked on composing and recording their next album — Silence — which was released in June 2001. An extensive tour followed, which included concerts throughout Europe (together with Gamma Ray) and Japan. In 2002 Sonata Arctica made its first incursion to America, putting on shows in Brazil and Chile. A live album entitled Songs of Silence was also released that year, consisting of gigs from their tour in Japan. By the end of 2002, Mikko Härkin left the band due to personal reasons.

Winterheart's Guild and Reckoning Night (2003–2006)
In the search for another keyboardist, the band received many applications and two of them were invited for auditions. Since they were well aware of the candidates' ability, the band decided to pick the new member based on personality. To this end, they spent a night drinking with each of the potentials to find out which one would fit best into the band's personality and mentality. Henrik Klingenberg was eventually chosen and joined the band in time to take part in the tour that followed the release of Winterheart's Guild. With the end of their contract with Spinefarm Records, the band received invitations from most European recording labels and eventually opted for Nuclear Blast.

Their third album — Winterheart's Guild was recorded with the help of the seasoned keyboard player Jens Johansson from Stratovarius who recorded the keyboard solos, while Kakko took care of the basics. The album was released in 2003.

In early 2004, the band was chosen as the opener for Iron Maiden's Japanese tour. Additionally, Tommy Portimo became a father; his wife gave birth to a baby girl in March. Reckoning Night was recorded in three months and released in October, with Klingenberg introducing the use of the organ to the band. Both the single and the EP of this release remained on the top of the Finnish charts simultaneously for over six weeks. A promotional tour was to follow, but Sonata Arctica was invited by the popular Nightwish to join their European tour, and thus made a change of plans.

In early 2005, Nightwish invited the band to open the concerts of their North American tour. This tour eventually got cancelled, but the members of Sonata Arctica opted to still make a short tour, playing concerts in Canada and the United States. On October 21, 2005, Sonata Arctica opened for Nightwish at the Hartwall Areena, Helsinki.

In 2006, the band released a live CD and DVD entitled For the Sake of Revenge, which was recorded in Tokyo in February 2005. Then, Spinefarm Records released a compilation album to get the most out of their contract with the band, since Sonata Arctica had changed to another label. The compilation is entitled The End of This Chapter and was released in Japan in August 2005 and in Europe in May 2006.

A computer video game was also planned, based on Sonata Arctica characters and music. The name of the game was going to be Winterheart's Guild, after the album. The game was to be developed by Zelian Games, and was to be an Action-RPG in a style between Fallout and Diablo. The game was cancelled for unannounced reasons but a demo was shown at the Leipzig video game conference in 2006, featuring Henrik Klingenberg as the playable character. In December 2006, the band began recording their fifth studio album.

Unia and The Days of Grays (2007–2011)

On May 25, 2007, Unia was released. The album's first single, "Paid in Full", was released on April 27, 2007. On August 6, 2007, the band announced on their website that guitarist Jani Liimatainen had been asked to leave the band due to problems related to his conscription. He was replaced by Elias Viljanen who had already filled in for him in the band's Finnish and Japanese shows during the spring and summer.

In October 2007, Sonata Arctica headlined the ProgPower USA VIII. Later, the band supported Nightwish across their 2008 tour of the United States and Canada and headlined at the shows that Nightwish cancelled due to Anette Olzon's sudden severe sickness.

It was announced on September 4, 2008 that the band's first two albums would be re-released with bonus tracks by Spinefarm UK on October 6.
The Days of Grays was released on September 16, 2009 in Finland and September 22 in the USA. Henrik stated that the new album would be in the same vein as Unia, but not as complex and darker. Singles from this album include "Flag in the Ground" and "The Last Amazing Grays". On August 28, 2009, the music video of "Flag in the Ground" was released to the web. The limited 2CD European edition of the album featured many of the album tracks with all instruments performed by a symphony orchestra.

The band also toured with DragonForce for the third U.S. leg of the Ultra Beatdown. In early 2010 they engaged on an Australian tour with Ensiferum and Melbourne band Vanishing Point. In April 2010, Sonata Arctica embarked on their USA and Canada Headlining tour for The Days of Grays. In October they headlined in Chile in support of the same album.

Stones Grow Her Name (2011–2013)

In January 2011, the band hinted in an online interview for Metaleater magazine that they were writing songs for a new album while on their current tour. Elias is quoted as saying, "I've been working on some new riffs, quite dark. Tony's been stuck in his bed scratching notes about some girl and her 'Luna Lust'." Tommy states later, "We've just got back from Cozumel, we had a good time, had lots of beers, loads more sun and thought about putting a bit more Queen stuff back into the music again." In April, the band recorded a live DVD in Oulu, Finland, entitled Live in Finland, which was released on November 11, 2011 (11/11/11).

It was announced on February 20, 2012 through the official Sonata Arctica website that the new album entitled Stones Grow Her Name would be released on 18 May in Europe and 22 May in North America .

The Album's first single and video "I Have A Right" was released on April 18, the second single from the album, "Shitload of Money" was released on September 14.

The Stones Grow Her Name World Tour began in April with summer festivals until August. The band plans to spend the fall playing headline shows in Finland and then mainland Europe. Several shows have also been announced for North America in December.

Pariah's Child, The Ninth Hour and Talviyö (2014–present)

In a June 2013 interview concerning Henrik Klingenberg's own band Silent Voices, Henrik confirmed Sonata Arctica would go into recording for their eighth studio album in September 2013. When pushed for more information, he assured jovially: "If it doesn't come out by next year, we're in big trouble!" 
Concerning the progress and style of this new album, he also mentioned "The bulk of the album, we already have the demos ..." as well as "we want to focus on making songs that work live."

During rehearsals, Henrik mentioned on his blog that songs they were rehearsing for the new album seemed to hearken towards Sonata Arctica's earlier days. He also mentioned their plan to record a 10-minute track for the new album.

On August 26, 2013 the band officially announced on their Facebook page that Marko Paasikoski had left the band due to unsolvable issues with being part of a touring ensemble, and was replaced by bassist Pasi Kauppinen.
On January 9, 2014, the band officially announced via their official website that the band's next studio album, Pariah's Child, will be released on March 28, 2014.

Tony Kakko commented on the style of the new album as well as its album artwork upon the release announcement:

In summer 2014, the band re-recorded their first album, Ecliptica. It was released in October 2014. Tony stated that the band was hoping to record the songs in a manner faithful to the original, not in a manner that would completely change the feel of their original album.

On September 3, 2014, Ouergh Records announced a Sonata Arctica tribute album. The album, A Tribute to Sonata Arctica featured bands from across the globe covering Sonata Arctica songs, with a focus on newer bands that were influenced by Sonata Arctica. Prominent bands included: Xandria, Van Canto, Stream of Passion, Arven, Powerglove, and Timeless Miracle. The album was endorsed by Tony Kakko. The tribute album was released September 12, 2015.

On December 18, 2015, Sonata Arctica released a Christmas-themed single, Christmas Spirits.

In February 2016, the band announced their plans to start recording a new album and release it in the final quarter of 2016. In July 2016, they announced on their Facebook page that the yet-to-be-titled album was mixed. On July 21, they officially announced the album's title, album artwork, and release date on their Facebook page. Their ninth studio album, The Ninth Hour, was released on October 7, 2016. The artwork featured a future Utopian landscape with technology and nature in the balance.

In November 2018, the band revealed that they were working on a new album, which its production had finished in 2019. On June 21, 2019 they released a lyric video for "A Little Less Understanding" and revealed the name of the tenth studio album Talviyö which was released via Nuclear Blast on September 6, 2019.

Musical style and influences

When asked if the band identified themselves with power metal, melodic metal or none of them, Kakko stated:

In a 2007 interview with C.B.Liddell, Tony Kakko cited the English rock band Queen as his biggest musical influence.

He also cites Stratovarius' Visions.

Members

Current members
 Tommy Portimo – drums (1995–present)
 Tony Kakko – lead vocals (1996–present), keyboards (1996–2000, 2003, studio only: 2007–present)
 Henrik Klingenberg – keyboards, keytar, backing vocals (2003–present)
 Elias Viljanen – guitars, backing vocals (2007–present)
 Pasi Kauppinen – bass, backing vocals (2013–present)

Former members
 Jani Liimatainen – guitars, backing vocals (1995–2007), lead vocals, keyboards (1995–1996)
 Marko Paasikoski – bass (1995–1996, 2000–2013), guitars (1996–1997), backing vocals (1995–1997, 2000–2013)
 Pentti Peura – bass, backing vocals (1996–1998)
 Janne Kivilahti – bass, backing vocals (1998–2000)
 Mikko Härkin – keyboards, backing vocals (2000–2002)

Guest musicians
 Nik Van-Eckmann − spoken passages (2001, 2004)
 Timo Kotipelto − vocals (2001, 2012)
 Jens Johansson − keyboard solos (2003)
 Peter Engberg − acoustic guitars, bouzouki, viola caipira, banjo, chromaharp, cavaquinho, Q-chord (2007, 2012)
 Johanna Kurkela − female vocals  (2009)
 Pekka Kuusisto – violin  (2012)
 Lauri Valkonen – double bass (2012)

Timeline

Discography

Studio albums
Ecliptica (1999)
Silence (2001)
Winterheart's Guild (2003)
Reckoning Night (2004)
Unia (2007)
The Days of Grays (2009)
Stones Grow Her Name (2012)
Pariah's Child (2014)
The Ninth Hour (2016)
Talviyö (2019)

Cover songs
 "Black Diamond" − Stratovarius (live, short clip in Stratovarius – Infinite Visions VHS/DVD)
 "Speed of Light" − Stratovarius (at the end of "False News Travel Fast" in Songs of Silence)
 "Fade to Black" − Metallica (Victoria's Secret, Takatalvi, A Tribute to the Four Horsemen)
 "Wind Beneath My Wings" − Bette Midler (Orientation)
 "Die With Your Boots On" − Iron Maiden (Last Drop Falls, Orientation)
 "World in My Eyes" − Depeche Mode (Don't Say a Word)
 "Two Minds, One Soul" − Vanishing Point (Don't Say a Word)
 "Still Loving You" − Scorpions (Successor, Takatalvi)
 "I Want Out" − Helloween (Successor, Takatalvi)
 "Out in the Fields" − Gary Moore (Paid in Full, Unia)
 "Hava Nagila" ("The Cage"/"Vodka" on For the Sake of Revenge and "Vodka" on Live in Finland)
 "Cowboys From Hell" – Pantera (live, Jani Liimatainen's Young Guitar DVD and Into the Storm bootleg DVD)
 "Hell Is Living Without You" – Alice Cooper (One for All, All for One)
 "I Can't Dance" – Genesis (Ecliptica – Revisited (15th Anniversary Edition))
 "Run to You" – Bryan Adams (The Ninth Hour)

References

External links

 Sonata Arctica's official website
 Sonata Arctica's official fanclub 
 Winterheart's Guild video game

 
Finnish heavy metal musical groups
Finnish power metal musical groups
Finnish progressive metal musical groups
Musical groups established in 1996
Nuclear Blast artists
1995 establishments in Finland